True Genius is a box set of material by American musician Ray Charles, first released on September 10, 2021, by Tangerine Records, as a six-CD collection. The set contains 90 remastered tracks by Charles, as well as eight previously unreleased songs, which were recorded live in Stockholm, Sweden, in 1972. The release of True Genius purposely coincided with the 90th anniversary of Charles's year of birth.

The six-CD release was followed by a condensed version of the material, True Genius: Sides of Ray, which was released as a double-disc vinyl album on November 19, 2021. On May 6, 2022, the unearthed recordings of Charles's 1972 Stockholm concert were issued as a standalone release titled Live in Stockholm 1972.

Background
True Genius was compiled by record producer John Burk—who produced Charles's final studio album, Genius Loves Company—and The Ray Charles Foundation, led by Valerie Ervin. During the assembly of True Genius, they discovered previously unreleased recordings of a concert by Charles held in Stockholm, Sweden, in 1972. The eight songs from that concert were included on the CD release of True Genius, and later received a standalone release as Live in Stockholm 1972.

Release
True Genius was first released on September 10, 2021, by Tangerine Records, as a six-CD set with a coffee table-style hardcover book. It was followed by a double-disc vinyl record release, True Genius: Sides of Ray, on November 19, 2021. Live in Stockholm 1972 received a limited edition colored vinyl record release on Record Store Day, on Black Friday in November 2021; this initial vinyl release was limited to 2,000 copies. Live in Stockholm 1972 later received a standard vinyl release on May 6, 2022.

Critical reception
Jon Pareles of The New York Times wrote that "This straightforward, career-spanning compilation covers his early years as he forges his fusion of gospel, swing, blues, country and pop, though for his pivotal 1950s Atlantic singles—"Hallelujah, I Love Her So," "I've Got a Woman" and "What'd I Say"—it swaps in live versions instead of the studio classics. It moves through his decades as an interpreter, when he homed in on the soul within other people's hits, and includes a rambunctious 1972 concert set from Stockholm and latter-day duets with admirers like Willie Nelson, Norah Jones and Billy Joel."

Track listing

CD version

Vinyl version (Sides of Ray)

References

Ray Charles compilation albums
2021 compilation albums